Jacques Rigaut (30 December 1898 – 9 November 1929) was a French surrealist poet. Born in Paris, he was part of the Dadaist movement. His works frequently talked about suicide and he came to regard its successful completion as his occupation. In 1929 at the age of 30, as he had announced, Rigaut shot himself, using a ruler to be sure the bullet would pass through his heart.

He is buried in the Cimetière de Montmartre.

Rigaut's works include:
 Agence Générale du Suicide 
 Et puis merde!
 Papiers Posthumes
 Lord Patchogue

His suicide inspired the book Will O' the Wisp by Pierre Drieu la Rochelle. The movie The Fire Within from Louis Malle is based on this book. The movie Oslo, August 31st directed by Joachim Trier, released in 2011, is also largely based on Will O' the Wisp although the narrative takes place in contemporary Norway. The Granada-based Spanish indie pop band Lori Meyers has a song entitled "La Vida de Jacques Rigaut" (The Life of Jacques Rigaut) with its lyrics relating with his life.

References

Sources
 4 Dada Suicides: Selected Texts of Arthur Cravan, Jacques Rigaut, Julien Torma & Jacques Vache (Anti-Classics of Dada) by Jacques Rigaut, Julien Torma, Jacques Vache, and Arthur Cravan.  Roger Conover (Editor), Terry J. Hale (Editor), Paul Lenti (Editor), Iain White (Editor). (1995) Atlas Press  
 Jacques Rigaut, portrait tiré  Laurent Cirelli (1998) Dilettante publishers  (French language)

Dada
Writers from Paris
1898 births
1929 suicides
Burials at Montmartre Cemetery
French male poets
20th-century French poets
20th-century male writers
20th-century French male writers
1929 deaths